The 2009–10 Macedonian Football Cup was the 18th season of Macedonia's football knockout competition. FK Rabotnichki were the defending champions, having won their second title. The 2009–10 champions were FK Teteks who won their first title.

Competition calendar

Preliminary round

|}

First round
The draw was held on 28 June 2009 in Skopje. Matches were played on 26 August 2009.

|colspan="3" style="background-color:#97DEFF" align=center|26 August 2009

|}

Second round
The draw was held on 16 September 2009 in Skopje. The first legs were played on 22 and 23 September 2009 and second were played on 29 and 30 September 2009.

|}

1 Ohrid, Lokomotiva and Fortuna withdrew their participations due to financial problems.

Quarter-finals
The draw was held on 20 October 2009 in Skopje. The first legs were played on 28 October 2009 and second were played on 25 November 2009.

|}

Semi-finals
The draw was held on 8 December 2009 in Skopje. The first legs were played on 7 April 2010 and the second on 5 May 2010.

Summary

|}

Matches

1–1 on aggregate. Rabotnichki won 5–4 in penalty shootout.

Teteks won 2–1 on aggregate.

Final

See also
2009–10 Macedonian First Football League
2009–10 Macedonian Second Football League

External links
 Official Website
 Macedonian Football

Macedonia
Cup
Macedonian Football Cup seasons